The 2015 Bangalore Challenger was a professional tennis tournament played on hard courts. It was the first edition of the tournament which was part of the 2015 ATP Challenger Tour. It took place in Bangalore, India between 19 and 25 October 2015.

Singles main draw entrants

Seeds

 1 Rankings are as of October 12, 2015.

Other entrants
The following players received wildcards into the singles main draw:
  Mohit Mayur Jayaprakash
  Sumit Nagal
  Suraj Prabodh
  Vishnu Vardhan
 
The following players received entry from the qualifying draw:
  Petros Chrysochos 
  Prajnesh Gunneswaran
  Temur Ismailov
  Sidharth Rawat

The following player entered as a lucky loser:
  Lakshit Sood

Champions

Singles

  James Ward def.  Adrián Menéndez-Maceiras, 6–2, 7–5

Doubles

  Saketh Myneni /  Sanam Singh def.  John Paul Fruttero /  Vijay Sundar Prashanth, 5–7, 6–4, [10–2]

External links

Bangalore Challenger